Guyana competed at the 1988 Summer Olympics in Seoul, South Korea. A total of eight athletes, seven men and one woman, competed for the nation in three sports.

Competitors
The following is the list of number of competitors in the Games.

Athletics

Boxing

Cycling

Two male cyclists represented Guyana in 1988.

Men's road race
 Byron James

Men's sprint
 Colin Abrams

References

External links
Official Olympic Reports

Nations at the 1988 Summer Olympics
1988
Olympics